Jumbe may refer to:

Aerodyne Jumbe, a French paraglider design
Friday Jumbe (born 1955), Malawian economist and politician
Sultan, a noble title
Jumbes of Nkhotakota, a dynasty of Swahili Arabs slave and ivory traders established in Malawi.